Barryroe is an undeveloped oil and gas field discovered in the Atlantic ocean due south of County Cork, Ireland. Several attempts were made to find a commercial field at the site in the 1970s but although they struck oil, none were commercially viable. It has been rated as the equivalent of a large North Sea oil field.

, the field is 80% owned by Providence Resources (via subsidiary Exola) and 20% by Lansdowne Oil and Gas (via subsidiary Lansdowne Celtic Sea).

Providence has long been seeking a partner to finance development of Barryroe. In 2015 it attempted partnership with Sequa Resources, and in 20182020 partnered with Chinese APEC Energy, both without success.

References

Oil fields of Ireland